The Eclipse IDE platform can be extended by adding different plug-ins. Notable examples include:

 Acceleo, an open source code generator that uses EMF-based models to generate any textual language (Java, PHP, Python, etc.).
 Actifsource, a modeling and code generation workbench.
 Adobe ColdFusion Builder, the official Adobe IDE for ColdFusion.
 Adobe Flash Builder (formerly Adobe Flex Builder), an Adobe IDE based on Eclipse for building Flex applications for the Flash Platform and mobile platforms.
 ADT Eclipse plugin developed by Google for the Android SDK.
 AnyLogic, a simulation modeling tool developed by The AnyLogic Company.
 Appcelerator, a cross platform mobile development tool by Axway Appcelerator
 Aptana, Web IDE based on Eclipse
 Avaya Dialog Designer, a commercial IDE to build scripts for voice self-service applications.
 Bioclipse, a visual platform for chemo- and bioinformatics.
 BIRT Project, open source software project that provides reporting and business intelligence capabilities for rich client and web applications.
 Bonita Open Solution relies on Eclipse for the modeling of processes, implementing a BPMN and a Web form editors.
 Cantata IDE is a computer program for software testing at run time of C and C++ programs.
 CityEngine procedural based city generator.
 Code Composer Studio Texas Instruments' IDE for microcontroller development.
 CodeWarrior Freescale's IDE for microcontrollers, since Version 10 (C/C++/Assembly compilers).
 Compuware OptimalJ, a model-driven development environment for Java
 Coverity Static Analysis, which finds crash-causing defects and security vulnerabilities in code
 DBeaver, universal database manager and SQL client
 ECLAIR, a tool for automatic program analysis, verification, testing and transformation
 EasyEclipse, bundled distributions of the Eclipse IDE
 Elysium, a frontend for the LilyPond music-engraving program
 g-Eclipse, an integrated workbench framework to access the power of existing Grid infrastructures
 GForge Advanced Server - Collaboration tool with multiframe view through Eclipse integration for multiple functions
 Google Plugin for Eclipse, Development tools to design, build, optimize and deploy cloud applications to Google App Engine
 GumTree, an integrated workbench for instrument control and data analysis
 IBM Rational Software Architect, supporting design with UML and development of applications. This product replaces some Rational Rose products family.
 IBM Rational Software Modeler is a robust, scalable solution for requirements elaboration, design, and general modeling. It supports design with UML. This product replaces some Rational Rose products family.
 IBM Rational Performance Tester is a performance testing tool used to identify the presence and cause of system performance bottlenecks.
 IBM Rational Method Composer, a software development process management and delivery platform
 IBM Rational Publishing Engine, a document generation solution
 IBM Lotus Expeditor a client-server platform that provides a framework to develop lightweight rich client applications for desktops and various mobile devices.
 IBM Lotus Symphony a set of applications free of charge: a word processor, a spreadsheet program, and a presentation program, each based on OpenOffice.org
 IBM Notes (since version 8), a client-server collaborative application platform, used for enterprise email and calendaring, as well as for collaborative business applications.
 Intel FPGA (formerly Altera), Nios-II EDS, embedded C/C++ software development environment for Intel Nios-II and ARM processors in the HPS part of SoC FPGA's.
Jasper Studio, a development environment for Jasper Reports
 Kalypso (software), an Open Source software project, that can be used as a general modeling system. It is focused mainly on numerical simulations in water management such as generation of concepts for flood prevention and protection or risk management.
 KNIME, an open source data analytics, reporting and integration platform.
 MontaVista DevRocket, plug-in to Eclipse
 MyEclipse, from Genuitec is an IDE which also enables Angular Typescript development from within the Java-Eclipse platform using its Webclipse plug-in and Angular IDE solution.
 Nodeclipse is Eclipse-based IDE for Node.js development.
 Nuxeo RCP, an open source rich client platform for ECM applications.
 OEPE, Oracle Enterprise Pack for Eclipse.
 OMNeT++, Network Simulation Framework.
 Parasoft C/C++test, an automated  C and C++ software testing tool for static analysis, Unit test-case generation and execution,  regression testing, runtime error detection, and code review.
 Parasoft Jtest,  an automated  Java software testing tool for static analysis, Unit test-case generation and execution,  regression testing, runtime error detection, and code review.
 Parasoft SOAtest  tool suite for testing and validating APIs and API-driven applications (e.g., cloud, mobile apps, SOA).
 Parasoft Virtualize, a service virtualization product that can create, deploy, and manage simulated test environments for software development and software testing purposes.
 PHP Development Tools (or simply PDT) is an open source IDE with basic functions for editing and debugging PHP application.
 PHPEclipse is an open source PHP IDE with integrated debugging, developed and supported by a committed community.
 Polyspace detects and proves the absence of certain run-time errors in source code with a plugin for Eclipse for C, C++, and Ada languages
 Powerflasher FDT is an Eclipse-based integrated development environment for building Flex applications for the Flash Platform and mobile platforms.
 Pulse (ALM) from Genuitec is a free or for-fee service intended for Eclipse tool management and application delivery, collaboration and management.
 PyDev is an Integrated Development Environment (IDE) used for programming in Python supporting code refactoring, graphical debugging, code analysis among other features. 
 Rapita Verification Suite (RVS) is an on-target software verification for critical embedded systems. 
 Red Hat JBoss Developer Studio
 Remote Component Environment is an integration platform for engineers which enables integration, workflow management and data management in a distributed environment.
 Rodin, a tool for software specification and refinement using the B-Method.
 RSSOwl, a Java RSS/RDF/Atom newsreader
 SAP NetWeaver Developer Studio, an IDE for most of the Java part of SAP technology
 Servoy, Servoy 4.0 is an Eclipse plug in to write business applications.
 Sirius allows creating custom graphical modeling workbenches by leveraging the Eclipse Modeling technologies, including EMF and GMF.
 Spatiotemporal Epidemiological Modeler (STEM), is an open source tool for creating and studying new mathematical models of Infectious Disease.
 SpringSource STS, plugin for Spring framework based development
 Sybase PowerDesigner, a data-modeling and collaborative design tool for enterprises that need to build or re-engineer applications. Teamcenter, from version 2007.1 this Product Lifecycle Management software uses Eclipse as platform.
 Tensilica Xtensa Xplorer, an IDE which  integrates software development, processor configuration and optimization, multiple-processor SOC architecture tools and SOC simulation into one common design environment.
 ThreadSafe, a static analysis tool for Java focused on finding and diagnosing concurrency bugs (race conditions, deadlocks, ...)
 uDig, a user-friendly GIS map-making program
 VistaMax IDE for Maemo, a visual Integrated Development Environment based on Eclipse
 VP/MS, Eclipse-based modeling language and product lifecycle management tool by CSC.
 WireframeSketcher, a wireframing tool for desktop, web and mobile applications.
 XMind, a cross-platform mind-mapping/brainstorming/presentation software application.
 Xilinx's EDK (Embedded Development Kit) is the development package for building MicroBlaze (and PowerPC) embedded processor systems in Xilinx FPGAs as part of the Xilinx IDE software (until version 14.7)
 Xilinx SDK as part of the newer Vivado design software package
 Zen Coding, A set of plugins for HTML and CSS hi-speed coding.
 Zend Studio An IDE used for developing PHP websites and web services.
 Zoom A profiling and performance analysis tool for Linux and Mac OS X.

References

Eclipse-based software